Rio Grande Mud is the second studio album by the American rock band ZZ Top. It was released in 1972 by London label. The album title was inspired by the Rio Grande, the river that forms the border between Mexico and Texas.

Background
ZZ Top frontman Billy Gibbons said of the album: It was the first record that brought us into step with the writing experience. We started documenting events as they happened to us on the road; all of these elements went into the songwriting notebook. As we went along, we were keeping track of skeleton ideas as they popped up. The craft was certainly developing.

Release

The only single released from the album was "Francine", which peaked at number 69 on the Billboard Hot 100. The A-side was the album version, while the B-side featured the song with the vocals re-recorded in Spanish. Another 45 version was released in the UK and Germany backed with "Down Brownie". Various official ZZ Top releases throughout the years, beginning in 1972, have used the alternative spelling "Francene", especially on the various 45 releases both within and outside the United States as well as the first edition of the LP.

In 1987, the album was remixed for CD release. On January 11, 2011, Rhino released a remastered version from the original 1972 mix on vinyl only. This album was put up for download on Amazon's MP3 store and iTunes as a digital download in 2012, and features the original mixes of the tracks that are on Chrome, Smoke & BBQ, and the 1987 remixes of the tracks that are not from that box set. The original mix of the album was released on CD in June 2013 as part of the box set The Complete Studio Albums (1970-1990).

Reception
AllMusic retrospectively gave the album 3.5 stars, stating: "With their second album, Rio Grande Mud, ZZ Top uses the sound they sketched out on their debut as a blueprint, yet they tweak it in slight but important ways."

The album peaked at number 104 on the Billboard 200 in June 1972.

Track listing

Personnel
ZZ Top
 Billy Gibbons – guitar, harmonica, vocals
 Dusty Hill – bass guitar, background vocals on "Francine" and "Chevrolet"
 Frank Beard – drums, percussion

Additional personnel
 Pete Tickle – acoustic guitar on "Mushmouth Shoutin'"

Production
 Bill Ham – production
 Robin Hood Brians – engineering

Charts

References

1972 albums
Albums produced by Bill Ham
London Records albums
ZZ Top albums